Badreddine Haddioui (born 25 December 1988, Mohammédia) is a Moroccan boxer. At the 2012 Summer Olympics, he competed in the Men's middleweight, but was defeated in the first round.

References

Living people
Olympic boxers of Morocco
Boxers at the 2012 Summer Olympics
Middleweight boxers
Moroccan male boxers

1988 births
People from Mohammedia
21st-century Moroccan people